The Pyramides at Port-Coton, Rough Sea is a series of six paintings produced by Claude Monet in 1886. They all show the rocky Atlantic coast of Belle-Île-en-Mer, visited and painted in the plein air by the artist between 12 September and 25 October that year.

Paintings in the series

Related works

See also
List of paintings by Claude Monet

References 

Paintings by Claude Monet
1886 paintings
Paintings in the collection of the Ny Carlsberg Glyptotek
Paintings in the collection of the Pushkin Museum
Paintings in Germany
Water in art